Musri (Assyrian: Mu-us-ri), or Muzri, was a small ancient kingdom, in northern areas of Iraqi Kurdistan. The area is now inhabited by Muzuri (Mussouri) Kurds.

Musri is also a geographical name mentioned in several Neo-Assyrian inscriptions and referring to Egypt, and not to a country in northern Arabia as once believed.  Compare Hebrew Mizraim.

References

Ancient Upper Mesopotamia
Geography of Iraqi Kurdistan